Australymexylon is a genus of beetles in the family Lymexylidae, containing the following species:

 Australymexylon australe Erichson, 1842
 Australymexylon fuscipenne (Lea, 1912)

References

Cucujoidea genera
Lymexylidae